Kinne Tonight is an Australian sketch comedy television series created, written and directed by Troy Kinne and Max Price first airing as a pilot, on 17 August 2018 on Network 10. The first season premiered on 27 May 2019.

In October 2019, Kinne Tonight was renewed for a second season which premiered on 25 May 2020 at 9:40 pm.

Cast

 Troy Kinne
 Sarah Bishop
 Max Price
 Genevieve Hegney
 Nicolette Minster
 Oliver Clark
 Josh Lawson
 Anna Hutchison
 Dave Thornton
 Nina Oyama
 Ashlea Renae
 Laura Dunemann
 Elliot Loney
 Ash Williams
 Des Dowling
 Natalie Tran
 Tom Seigert
 Daniel Connell
 Tommy Flanagan
 Bev Killick

Episodes

Pilot Episode

Season 1 (2019)

Season 2 (2020)

See also

 Kinne

References

External links
 
 Big Yellow Taxi Productions
 

Network 10 original programming
English-language television shows
2018 Australian television series debuts
2010s Australian comedy television series
2020s Australian comedy television series
Television shows set in Melbourne